Events in the year 1890 in Brazil.

Incumbents

Federal government 
 President: Marshal Deodoro da Fonseca (de facto)
 Vice-President: none

Governors 
 Alagoas: 
 until 25 October: Pedro Paulino de Fonseca
 25 October-18 December: Roberto Calheiros de Meio
 starting 18 December: Manuel de Araujo Gois
 Amazonas: 
 until 4 January: Government Junta
 4 January-2 November: Augusto Ximeno de Villeroy
 starting 2 November: Eduardo Gonçalves Ribeiro
 Bahia: Manuel Vitorino then Hermes Ernesto da Fonseca then Virgílio Clímaco Damásio then José Gonçalves da Silva
 Ceará: Luís Antônio Ferraz
 Goiás: Rodolfo Gustavo da Paixão
 Maranhão:
 Mato Grosso: Antônio Maria Coelho
 Minas Gerais: 
 until 10 February: Cesário Alvim 
 10 February-20 July: João Pinheiro da Silva
 20 July-23 July: Domingos José da Rocha
 starting 23 July: Chispim Jacques Bias Fortes
 Pará: Justo Chermont
 Paraíba: Venâncio Neiva
 Paraná: José Marques Guimarães then Uladislau Herculano de Freitas then Américo Lobo Leite Pereira then Joaquim Monteiro de Carvalho e Silva then Serzedelo Correia then Joaquim Monteiro de Carvalho e Silva then José Cerqueira de Aguiar Lima
 Pernambuco: 
 until 25 April: José Simeão de Oliveira
 25 April-21 June: Albino Gonçalves Meira
 21 June-4 August: Ambrósio Machado da Cunha Cavalcanti
 4 August-23 October: Henrique Pereira de Lucena
 starting 23 October: José Antônio Correia da Silva
 Piauí: 
 until 4 June: Gregório Taumaturgo de Azevedo
 4 June-23 August: Joaquim Nogueira Paranaguá
 23 August-19 October: Gabino Besouro
 19 October-27 November: João da Cruz e Santos
 starting 27 November: Álvaro Moreira de Barros Oliveira Lima
 Rio Grande do Norte: 
 until 8 February: Adolfo Afonso da Silva Gordo
 8 February-10 March: Jerome Américo Raposo Chamber
 10 March-19 September: Joaquim Xavier da Silveira Júnior
 19 September-8 November: Pedro de Albuquerque Maranhão
 8 November-7 December: John Gomes Ribeiro
 starting 7 December Castro and Manuel do Nascimento Silva
 Rio Grande do Sul: 
 until 11 February: José Antônio Correia da Câmara and Visconde de Pelotas
 11 February-6 May: Júlio Anacleto Falcão da Frota
 6 May-13 May: Francisco da Silva Tavares
 13 May-24 May: Carlos Machado de Bittencourt
 starting 24 May: Cândido José da Costa
 Santa Catarina: Lauro Müller (until 29 June), Gustavo Richard (starting 29 June)
 São Paulo: Prudente de Morais (until 18 October), Jorge Tibiriçá Piratininga (starting 18 October)
 Sergipe: Felisbelo Firmo de Oliveira Freire (until 17 August), vacant thereafter

Vice governors 
 Rio de Janeiro: 
 Rio Grande do Norte: Pedro Maranhão
 São Paulo: Francisco Glicério and Luís Pereira Barreto (starting 22 January)

Events 
 6 January – A state funeral is held for the former Empress Teresa Cristina of Brazil, in Lisbon.  A mass is attended by members of several European royal families.
 25 January – A territorial dispute between Argentina and Brazil over the eastern sector of Misiones ("Questão Palmas") is resolved by the signing of the Treaty of Montevideo by Quintino Bocaiúva, the minister of external affairs.
 20 March – The battle cruiser Almirante Tamandaré is launched at Rio de Janeiro Dockyards.
 22 March – The Imperial Order of the Rose is abolished by the interim government. 
 October – Jorge Tibiriçá Piratininga becomes governor of the State of São Paulo, succeeding Prudente de Morais.

Births 
 6 June – Leo Vaz, writer, teacher and journalist (d. 1973)
 1 July – Júlio Marcondes Salgado
 8 November – Astrojildo Pereira, Communist politician (d. 1965)
 29 December – João Ghelfi, painter (d. 1925)

Deaths 
 1 November – Júlio Ribeiro, naturalist novelist, philologist, journalist and grammarian (b. 1845; tuberculosis) 
 27 November – França Júnior, playwright, journalist and painter (b. 1838)

References 

 
1890s in Brazil
Years of the 19th century in Brazil
Brazil
Brazil